The following lists events that happened during 1984 in Libya.

Incumbents
 Prime Minister: Jadallah Azzuz at-Talhi (until 16 February), Muhammad az-Zaruq Rajab (starting 16 February)

Events

March
 Four Libyan nationals are arrested in London on charges following explosions at Manchester and Heathrow airports. Diplomatic relations between Britain and Libya were broken. Four British are taken hostage in retaliation.

April
 30 April - Muammar Gaddafi proposes a mutual withdrawal of both French and Libyan forces from Chad, ending Operation Manta. The offer was accepted, and four months later, Mitterrand and Gaddafi met on September 17, announcing that the troop withdrawal would start on September 25, and be completed by November 10.

June
 5 June - Al-Sadek Hamed Al-Shuwehdy is publicly executed in an open air basketball stadium. Huda the executioner became notorious to the nation that day, when she completed the imperfect execution act.

August
 13 August - signing of the Oujda Treaty aiming to establish a "union of states" between the Libya and Morocco, and eventually to create a "Great Arab Maghreb".
 28 August - Gaddafi lays the foundation stone in Sarir area for the commencement of the construction of the Great Man-Made River Project.

References

 
1980s in Libya
Years of the 20th century in Libya
Libya
Libya